St George is a marble sculpture by Donatello. It is one of fourteen sculptures commissioned by the guilds of Florence to decorate the external niches of the Orsanmichele church. St. George was commissioned by the guild of the armorers and sword makers, the Arte dei Corazzai e Spadai.

A stone thrown at the sculpture in 1858 broke its nose, and in 1892 Donatello's St. George was moved to the Bargello Museum in Florence. From 1892 to 2008 a bronze replica was placed in the original niche, to be replaced by a marble replica on 23 April 2008. The original sculpture was stolen from the Villa Medici in Poggio a Caiano, but in May 1945 it was recovered by Frederick Hartt in Neumelans in the South Tyrol and returned to Florence on 20 July 1945. The box base was added back onto the statue in 1976.

Description 
Saint George is sculptured as a young, brave, determined and strong man in armor. He is not standing in contrapposto, although his right leg is turned to the same angle as his shield, visibly his weight is on both legs. Even though he is fully clothed, there is still the sense of a muscular body underneath. His right hand originally probably held some sort of a blade. Drill marks on his head indicate, that he probably also wore some kind of helmet or wreath.

St George's eyes are looking up and his face indicates some kind of anxiety and emotionality before attacking the dragon. His eyebrows are knit together and there are wrinkles on his forehead.

Relief 

There is a stone relief under the figure, that is displaying a woman observing St George slaying the dragon in the middle. There is a cave on the right, colonnade on the left and the relief also has a background with trees. The closets objects are carved in relatively high relief, whereas the cave, the colonnade and the background trees are carved in low relief. This technique is called Stiacciato.

References

Sculptures by Donatello
George
Sculptures of the Bargello
Stolen works of art
Vandalized works of art
Saint George (martyr)